I Just Want You to Know may refer to:

"I Just Want You to Know", a song by Relient K from The Nashville Tennis EP, included with The Bird and the Bee Sides
"I Just Want You to Know", a song by Traffic included with some editions of John Barleycorn Must Die
I Just Want You to Know, a book by Kate Gosselin

See also
I Want You to Know (disambiguation)